Ginásio Nélio Dias is an indoor sporting arena located in Natal, Brazil.  The capacity of the arena is 10,000 spectators and opened in 2008.  It hosts indoor sporting events such as basketball and volleyball, and also hosts concerts.

External links
Arena information
Article on arena
Article on arena

Indoor arenas in Brazil
Sports venues in Rio Grande do Norte